Verticordia mitchelliana, commonly known as rapier featherflower, is a flowering plant in the myrtle family, Myrtaceae and is endemic to the south-west of Western Australia. It is a shrub with bright red, rapier-like flowers in spring and early summer, which readily distinguish it from other species. It is commonly grown in private gardens and some forms have larger flowers than those usually found in the wild.

Description

They are erect, egg-shaped, have short, soft hairs on the outside and a few irregular teeth on the tip. Flowering time is from October to December.

Taxonomy and naming
Verticordia mitchelliana was first formally described by Charles Gardner in 1933 from a specimen collected near Bencubbin and the description was published in Journal of the Royal Society of Western Australia. The specific epithet (mitchelliana) honours Sir James Mitchell who was Premier of Western Australia at the time.

There are two subspecies:

When Alex George reviewed the genus Verticordia in 1991, he placed this species in subgenus Verticordia, section Intricata along with V. monadelpha, and V. pulchella.

Distribution and habitat
This verticordia grows in sand, usually with other species of Verticordia in heath and shrubland. It occurs in disjunct populations between Peak Charles and Kulja in the Avon Wheatbelt, Coolgardie and Mallee biogeographic regions.

Conservation
Subspecies mitchelliana  is classified as  "Priority Three" by the Western Australian Government Department of Parks and Wildlife meaning that it is poorly known and known from only a few locations but is not under imminent threat. Subspecies implexior is classified as "Not Threatened''.

Use in horticulture
Rapier featherflower has been grown in gardens since the 1970s and several forms have been developed. It grows well in a range of soils as long as they are well drained, and it is resistant to pest attack as well as drought- and frost-tolerant. It can be propagated from both seed and from cuttings.

References

mitchelliana
Rosids of Western Australia
Eudicots of Western Australia
Plants described in 1933
James Mitchell (Australian politician)